The 470th Military Intelligence Brigade is a unit of the United States Army and subordinate to the U.S. Army Intelligence and Security Command. Its mission is to provide tailored, multi-disciplined intelligence and counter-intelligence in support of United States Army South (ARSOUTH) and United States Southern Command (USSOUTHCOM). The 470th is headquartered at Fort Sam Houston, Texas with subordinate battalions located in Texas and Florida. Elements of the 470th have participated in Operation Just Cause (when formerly based in Panama) and have deployed in support of Operation Iraqi Freedom and Operation Enduring Freedom.

History
Constituted 12 July 1944 in the Army of the United States as the 470th Counter Intelligence Corps Detachment.
Activated 31 July 1944 at Quarry Heights in the Canal Zone.
Allotted 19 October 1951 to the Regular Army.
Redesignated 25 July 1961 as the 470th Intelligence Corps Detachment.
Reorganized and redesignated 14 September 1964 as the 470th Intelligence Corps Group.
Redesignated 15 October 1966 as the 470th Military Intelligence Group.
Reorganized and redesignated 16 October 1987 as Headquarters and Headquarters Company, 470th Military Intelligence Brigade.
Reorganized and redesignated 16 October 1991 as Headquarters and Headquarters Detachment, 470th Military Intelligence Brigade.
Inactivated 15 October 1997 in Panama.
Redesignated 28 February 2002 as Headquarters and Headquarters Detachment, 470th Military Intelligence Group.
Activated 16 October 2002 in Puerto Rico.
Reactivated 22 August 2003 in Fort Sam Houston, Texas.
Group subsequently redesignated as a brigade.
201st MI Battalion activated on April 12, 2006 as a unit specializing in interrogation.
201st MI Battalion deployed to Iraq (Camp Cropper); September 2007 to December 2009
14th MI Battalion activated on 15 October 2008 and deployed to Camp Cropper, Iraq during 2009-2010.
314th MI Battalion redesignated in 2009 as 717th MI Battalion.
201st MI Battalion deployed to Afghanistan during 2010-2011.
206th and 306th MI Battalions subordinated to the 470th MI Brigade on April 29, 2011.
14th MI Battalion deployed to Afghanistan during 2011-2012.
14th MI Battalion Inactivated on 14 June 2013.
201st MI Battalion deployed to Afghanistan during 2012-2013.

Structure
470th Military Intelligence Brigade
  Headquarters & Headquarters Company
  312th Military Intelligence Battalion
 717th Military Intelligence Battalion
  377th Military Intelligence Battalion (Army Reserve)

References

External links
 470th Military Intelligence Brigade
Investigation of Intelligence Activities at Abu Ghraib; Investigation of the Abu Ghraid Prison and 205th Military Intelligence Brigade; Investigation of the Abu Ghraib Detention Facility and 205th Military Intelligence Brigade (Google Books),
Divorcing the Dictator: America's Bungled Affair with Noriega (Google Books),
Homeland Security: An Introduction to Principles and Practice, Second Edition (Google Books),
Lawrence A. Yates, The U.S. Military Intervention in Panama: Origins, Planning, and Crisis Management, June 1987-December 1989 (The U.S. Military Intervention in Panama: Origins, Planning, and Crisis Management, June 1987-December 1989 (Paperback))
The Gun, the Gavel, and the Olive Branch, The Alcalde, March 2008 (The Alcalde),
470th Military Intelligence Brigade Unit History, 1944-1997,
The Torture Papers: The Road to Abu Ghraib,
America in Peril,
The U.S. Invasion of Panama: The Truth Behind Operation ' Just Cause',
Torture and Truth: America, Abu Ghraib, and the War on Terrror,
Monstering: Inside America's Policy of Secret Interrogations and Torture in the Terror War,
Operation Just Cause
The Senator Joe Kennedy report on the training manuals is linked at fas.org here

Military intelligence brigades of the United States Army
Military units and formations established in 1987
Military units and formations disestablished in 1997
Military units and formations established in 2003